Brigadier General William Ward Orme was born in Washington, D.C. in 1832. He moved to Bloomington, Illinois, in McLean County, prior to 1860 where he practiced law in the law firm of Swett & Orme. His partner was Leonard Swett.  While practicing law in Illinois he caught the attention of Abraham Lincoln who called Orme the most promising lawyer in Illinois.

He was a delegate to the Illinois State Constitutional Convention in 1860. He was a friend of Supreme Court Justice David Davis. When Abraham Lincoln appointed Davis to the Supreme Court, Davis wrote Orme about the news.

Orme formed and commanded the 94th Illinois Volunteer Infantry Regiment, known as the "McLean Regiment." At the time, he was a colonel.  He led a brigade under Francis J. Herron at the Battle of Prairie Grove and, for his performance there, was promoted to brigadier general postdated to 29 November 1862.  Herron's division was transferred to the Army of the Tennessee and Orme continued in command of his brigade during the Siege of Vicksburg.  Upon the Confederate surrender, Orme's brigade led the Union army into the fallen the city.

It was during his time in Mississippi that Orme contracted tuberculosis.  His brigade was transferred to the Department of the Gulf but he was soon forced relinquish his command due to failing health.  He was appointed commander of the Camp Douglas Prison but even that became to difficult for his health.  He retired from the military in 1864 to become Supervising Agent for the United States Treasury.  Orme finally succumbed to his illness and died in 1866 at his home in Illinois.

A collection of Orme's papers is held by the University of Illinois Library's Illinois History and Lincoln Collections.

A bronze marker in Orme's honor was erected in 1917 at Vicksburg National Military Park

See also
List of American Civil War generals (Union)

References

Political Graveyard
Famous Ormes
Lincoln's Supreme Court by David Mayer Silver. Urbana: University of Illinois, 1956
Report of Col. William W. Orme, Ninety-fourth Illinois Infantry, commanding Second Brigade
Levy, George To Die in Chicago: Confederate Prisoners at Camp Douglas 1863-1865, 1999

External links
William Ward Orme - McLean County Museum of History

1832 births
1866 deaths
Lawyers from Washington, D.C.
Military personnel from Washington, D.C.
People of Illinois in the American Civil War
Politicians from Bloomington, Illinois
Illinois lawyers
Union Army generals
19th-century American lawyers